Rvarud (also, Rüvarud, Revarut, and Rivarud) is a village and municipality in the Lerik Rayon of Azerbaijan.  It has a population of 820.

References 

Populated places in Lerik District